The 85th 2008 Lithuanian Athletics Championships were held in S. Darius and S. Girėnas Stadium, Kaunas on 18–19 July 2008.

Men

Women

External links 
 Lithuanian athletics

Lithuanian Athletics Championships
Lithuanian Athletics Championships, 2008
Lithuanian Athletics Championships